Calmella cavolini is a small aeolid (sea slug), with a maximum length of 12mm. It has smooth elongate rhinophores, oral tentacles, and angular anterior foot corners. Cerata, with a common stalk each, are arranged in groups. The front 3 ceratal clusters, which are on each side, are oppositely arranged but the posterior 3 ceratal clusters are arranged alternately. The color of digestive gland duct is bright red but the apical cnidosac is white in color. The jaw plates are purplish red and they show through each side of the slug's head as a reddish color spot. It was reported that it feeds on the hydroid, Eudendrium.

Distribution
C. cavolini is found in the Mediterranean Sea and the North Atlantic Ocean, near Europe; mainly Spain and Portugal.

Notes

References
 Gofas, S.; Le Renard, J.; Bouchet, P. (2001). Mollusca. in: Costello, M.J. et al. (Ed.) (2001). European Register of Marine Species: a Check-list of the Marine Species in Europe and a Bibliography of Guides to Their Identification. Collection Patrimoines Naturels. 50: pp. 180–213

External links
 

Flabellinidae
Gastropods described in 1846